Kent Gaffney (born January 3, 1967) was a Republican member of the Illinois House of Representatives from the 52nd district.

Gaffney has an undergraduate degree from Purdue University and did graduate studies at the University of Illinois. Prior to election to the legislature, Gaffney worked as the director of appropriations for the Republican Caucus in the Illinois Legislature. Gaffney and his wife Elizabeth are the parents of two children. Gaffney was appointed to succeed the late Mark H. Beaubien, Jr. by local Republican Party leaders on June 30, 2011 and officially took office July 4, 2011. Gaffney lost the March 2012 Republican primary to David McSweeney.

References

External links
Gaffney campaign bio
State Legislature bio

1967 births
Purdue University alumni
University of Illinois alumni
Living people
Republican Party members of the Illinois House of Representatives